Timorichthys is a genus of viviparous brotulas so far known from the East China Sea and the Timor Sea.

Species
There are currently two recognized species in this genus:
 Timorichthys angustus J. G. Nielsen, Okamoto & Schwarzhans, 2013
 Timorichthys disjunctus J. G. Nielsen & Schwarzhans, 2011

References

Bythitidae